Filipino singer and actor Sam Concepcion has released three studio albums, two extended plays and thirteen singles.

Albums

Studio albums

Extended plays

Video albums

Singles

Guest appearances

References

Discographies of Filipino artists
Pop music discographies
Rhythm and blues discographies